Henry Anthony Williams  (28 May 1939 – 1 October 2016), known professionally as Toni Williams or  Antoni Williams, was a Cook Island-born New Zealand pop singer, who began singing at the Gandhi Hall in Auckland City where he became a local sensation.

Background
Born Henry Anthony Williams on 28 May 1939, in Parekura in the Avarua District of Rarotonga, he was the son of a doctor. Owing to his father's being employed by the New Zealand government, Williams' childhood was taken up by moving between Rarotonga and the outer Cook Islands. He moved to Auckland in 1950 at the age of 11 for schooling. As a youngster he injured himself playing football. With a hip condition as a result, he stayed at the Wilson Home for Crippled Children for a period of time.

Career
Williams cited his interest in the guitar and singing as coming from spending 13 months in hospital as a result of a football accident. Not long after his hospitalisation, Williams formed the Housewarmers, which was a little group that performed at small family events. Two years later, the band by Williams' direction became Toni Williams and The Tremellos. After that things started happening, and he toured New Zealand under the promoter Harry M. Williams.

In 1960 his single, "Cradle Of Love" bw "Brush Those Tears From Your Eyes" was released on the La Gloria label. Also that same year, "Let the Little Girl Dance" bw "In A Mansion Stands My Love", and "Endlessly"/"Is A Bluebird Blue" were released by La Gloria. Williams toured with the Howard Morrison Quartet, and in 1965 he married the Miss Canterbury beauty pageant winner. 

In 1972, his single "Tellabout" (composed by Tony McCarthy), was an APRA Silver Scroll-nominated song.

In the 2010 Queen's Birthday Honours, Williams was appointed a Member of the New Zealand Order of Merit for services to entertainment

Death
Williams died in Christchurch on 1 October 2016, aged 77.

Singles

References

External links

1939 births
2016 deaths
People from Rarotonga
Cook Island emigrants to New Zealand
New Zealand pop singers
Members of the New Zealand Order of Merit